Şevkipaşazade Ayetullah Bey (1888 in Kadıköy, Istanbul – 1919), was an Ottoman Empire footballer of Circassian descent. He was the founder and second president of the major Turkish multi-sport club Fenerbahçe SK between 1908–09.

Biography 

Ayetullah Bey became the first secretary general when he was just 22. In addition, he served the club as a goalkeeper and defender. Ayetullah Bey, graduated from Saint Joseph’s College. He came from the House of Anzorq in the Ubykh tribe of Circassians.

Ayetullah Bey's father was a brigadier general in the Ottoman Army. His name was Şevki Pasha. Ayetullah Bey was known as "Şevkipaşazade". After graduating from, Lycée Saint-Joseph, Istanbul he started to work as a civil servant in the Ottoman Bank. He then resigned and founded a company that sells water. He was a member of the first squads of Fenerbahçe, playing as the goalkeeper. Later, he also served the club as a president.

References

External links 
 Fenerbahçe official website

1888 births
1919 deaths
Footballers from Istanbul
Fenerbahçe S.K. presidents
Fenerbahçe S.K. footballers
Association football defenders
Association football goalkeepers
People from the Ottoman Empire of Circassian descent
Footballers from the Ottoman Empire